If It Don't Fit, Use a Bigger Hammer is a 2002 German comedy film directed by .

Plot 
Kümmel, Kalle and Horst work for the contractor Werner Wiesenkamp, who runs a small construction company in Bergkamen in the district of Unna. Since Kümmel, Kalle and Horst are constantly clammy and the boss Wiesenkamp lives on a large foot, the three employees persuade the boss on his garden party to hire a Polish illegal worker. However, Wiesenkamp sets up the young architecture student Philipp as an additional worker (much to Horst's unwillingness), who actually only needs an internship certificate for his new employer in Asia. Philip, who hopes to get this proof without real work, with the help of his uncle (a city councilor), will be ripped off by Wiesenkamp at the decisive moment.

The following day Philipp appears on the construction site, still assuming that he only has to wait for Wiesenkamp's signature. First, however, he lands on the neighboring construction site, where the construction company of Wiesenkamps brother Ernst builds. As the misunderstanding clears up and the polisher brings Jochen Philipp to the correct construction site, the contrast could not be greater: While the construction site of Wiesenkamp's brother looks professional, everything seems messy and improvised on the other construction site. However, until Wiesenkamp arrives and brings Marek to the Poles, Philipp von Kümmel, Kalle and Horst are regarded as additional workers, with Horst in particular harassing Philipp the academic at every opportunity.

Philip should u. a. scaffolding, but instead tries to rebook his flight to Kuala Lumpur. Kümmel, Kalle and Horst stage Marek's death by falling down from the scaffolding to allow Wiesenkamp to pay for their silence. Philipp, who sees himself as guilty of Marek's "accident", sets off to alert the ambulance. When this arrives at the construction site, there is no indication of an accident.

After work, Kümmel, Kalle and Horst seem to let Marek's "corpse" disappear by cutting them up with a circular saw, packing them in plastic bags and setting them on the construction site. Philipp is in the meantime goo.  On the same evening Kümmel, Kalle and Horst celebrate a small celebration at Horst's home - where Marek is also present and gets his money. Here it is clear that Marek is not dead, but has made common cause with the others.

During the celebration, Philipp appears to Astrid, Horst's daughter, who worked on Wiesenkamp's garden party and also studies architecture. Astrid came "by accident" past the construction site to ask Philip if he could help her set up her new computer. Horst, who is not enthusiastic about the approaching relationship between his daughter and Philipp, throws Philip more or less friendly out of his house, not without him on the doorstep still something to say. During the conversation Marek comes in the background, but is not seen by Philipp. This is just the beginning of a series of scenes in which Marek can be seen again and again, mostly in premises that Wiesenkamp also visits.

Meanwhile, the company is in financial difficulties, but the three employees and intern Philipp explain themselves ready to complete the last construction project on time and thus help their boss Wiesenkamp out of financial distress. For example, they use asbestos insulation, which Kalle gets for free from his brother-in-law Siggi, who works in a hardware store.

At the completion, however, unimaginable complications arise, so the house z. For example, a prefabricated kit, and in excavation work, the four encounter an old aerial bombardment of the US Air Force. Instead of commissioning the ordnance clearance service, Kümmel, Kalle and Horst decide to bury the bomb on the spot and simply build the yard one meter shorter than planned in the blueprint. Here, Philipp can score: In a nightly meeting on Astrid's computer, he not only fakes the blueprints, but also gets closer to Astrid.

Thanks to Philip's help, the construction project can continue as planned, and the initial teasing stops abruptly. To celebrate this success, visit Kümmel, Kalle and Horst together with Philip the red light district. Here Philipp tells a prostitute in drunken condition that he has killed a human being.  However, when Werner Wiesenkamp's wife and his brother disappear to Majorca, things take a dramatic turn.

The next morning, Astrid visits the construction site to ask Philip why he did not attend her appointment. Horst tells his daughter that Philipp was with him and the others in the brothel. Werner Wiesenkamp, who is also a sports pilot, discovers at the airport that Marek is still alive, whereupon he joins the Construction site drives to confront its employees. Meanwhile, a police operation is taking place on the construction site, as the police prostitute has told Philipps story. The forensics found in the foundation of the plastic bags that were cemented by Kümmel, Kalle and Horst after Marek's accident. However, the bags contain only several cans of used oil and not, as assumed, the dismembered corpse of Marek. The construction site is then closed by the authorities.

Kümmel, Kalle and Horst are hired by Ernst Wiesenkamp, Werner's brother, but released shortly thereafter. Meanwhile, Werner Wiesenkamp plans to mount the aerial bomb from the construction site under his sports plane and "put it on his roof" for his brother. Although Kümmel, Kalle, Horst, Astrid and Philipp can successfully prevent this project, they do not, however, detonate the bomb when handling the excavator. The explosion uncovers a disused mining tunnel that leads from Werner Wiesenkamp's construction site to the adjacent construction site of Ernst Wiesenkamp. Caraway, Kalle, Horst, Philipp and Werner unceremoniously tear in the old mining pillars.

Back in the daylight, they discover that the topping-out ceremony is on Ernst Wiesenkamp's construction site, and Werner tries to stop his brother. However, Ernst can not be impressed, and when the straightening tree is lowered, the shell of the house collapses.  Therefore, the contract for the establishment of the kindergarten not serious, but to the company "Marek and Partner": Werner Wiesenkamp has reconciled with Marek, who has become rich in the meantime by stock trading. Both have allied themselves professionally, whereby Werners construction company is rehabilitated. Philipp and Astrid are happy together, while Kümmel, Kalle and Horst work again at Werner Wiesenkamp.

Cast 

Dietmar Bär - Werner Wiesenkamp
Ralf Richter - Kalle
Hilmi Sözer - Kümmel
 - Horst
Peter Thorwarth - Philipp
Alexandra Maria Lara - Astrid
 - Marek
 - Urte
 - Arno
Michael Brandner - Ernst Wiesenkamp
 - Gerda Wiesenkamp
 - Mama Wiesenkamp

References

External links 

2002 comedy films
2002 films
German comedy films
Features based on short films
Films adapted into television shows
2000s German films